Mantgum is a railway station in Mantgum, Netherlands. The station opened on 16 June 1883 and is located on the Leeuwarden–Stavoren railway. The services are operated by Arriva. The station was closed between 15 May 1938 and 1 May 1940 and between 24 November 1940 and 3 June 1973. The station is 10 km from Leeuwarden and 12 km from Sneek.

Train services
The following services currently call at Mantgum:
2x per hour local service (stoptrein) Leeuwarden - Sneek
1x per hour local service (stoptrein) Leeuwarden - Sneek - Stavoren

Bus services
The following bus services depart from the outside the station:

93: Leeuwarden NS - Deinum - Boksum - Jellum - Bears - Weidum - Jorwert - Mantgum - Easterwierrum - Sneek

The 93 is operated by Arriva and operates Monday to Saturday 1x per hour.

See also
 List of railway stations in Friesland

External links
NS website 
Dutch Public Transport journey planner 

Railway stations in Friesland
Railway stations opened in 1883
Railway stations opened in 1940
Railway stations opened in 1973
Railway stations closed in 1938
Railway stations closed in 1940
1883 establishments in the Netherlands
Railway stations in the Netherlands opened in the 19th century